Lummus Park may refer to:

 Lummus Park Historic District, a neighborhood in Downtown Miami
 Lummus Park, Miami, the park in Lummus Park Historic District
 Lummus Park, Miami Beach, a park in South Beach